The Schleicher Ka 6 is a single-seat glider designed by Rudolf Kaiser, built by Alexander Schleicher GmbH & Co, Germany and is constructed of spruce and plywood with fabric covering. The design initially featured a conventional tailplane and elevator which was later replaced by an all-moving tailplane in the -Pe and Ka 6E variants. Variants built before the -CR and -BR used a main skid as the principal undercarriage, with later variants including the Ka 6E using a wheel as the main undercarriage with no nose skid. Other modifications for the Ka 6E include a more aerodynamic fuselage with glassfibre nose and wingroot fairings, longer canopy, and modified aluminium airbrakes.

Variants

Dates of initial airworthiness approval in brackets:
 Ka 6 – Initial version; span , (30 October 1956).
 Ka 6B (27 September 1957)
 Ka 6B-Pe – The Ka 6B with all-flying tailplane, (20 May 1960).
 Ka 6BR – The Ka 6B with the main skid removed and a relocated mainwheel, (27 September 1957).
 Ka 6CR – The Ka 6C with the main skid removed and a relocated mainwheel, (24 February 1959).
 Ka 6CR-Pe – The Ka 6CR with all-flying tailplane, (20 May 1960).
 Ka 6E  The ultimate Ka-6, with all-flying tailplane, (29 July 1965)

Aircraft on display
US Southwest Soaring Museum – Ka 6B-Pe and Ka 6e

Specifications (Ka 6E)

See also

References

Notes

Bibliography

 Coates, Andrew, Janes World Sailplanes and Motorgliders. London. Macdonald and Jane's Publishers Ltd., 1978. 

 Macfadyen, Tim. BGA Data sheet for Schleicher Ka-6, BR and CR (Rhönsegler). Leicester. British Gliding Association. 1 July 2003.

External links

 British Gliding Association, Ka 6 datasheet 
 British Gliding Association, Ka 6E datasheet 
 Ka6 Sailplane history and information website

Schleicher aircraft
1950s German sailplanes
High-wing aircraft
Aircraft first flown in 1955